Ancuța Goia (born June 22, 1976) is a retired Romanian rhythmic gymnast.

She competed for Romania in the rhythmic gymnastics all-around competition at the 1992 Olympic Games in Barcelona. She finished 16th in the qualification.

References

External links 
 Ancuța Goia at Sports-Reference.com

1976 births
Living people
Romanian rhythmic gymnasts
Gymnasts at the 1992 Summer Olympics
Olympic gymnasts of Romania
20th-century Romanian women